Alotau District is a district of the Milne Bay Province of Papua New Guinea.

Location, LLGs and wards
Alotau District shares a border with Oro and Central provinces. It comprises 7 LLGs and 157 wards:
 Alotau urban (6 wards - the district seat).
 Daga (18 wards)
 Huhu (29 wards)
 Makamaka (27 wards)
 Maramatana (19 wards)
 Weraura (30 wards)
 Suau (28 wards)

Population and area
According to the 2011 census, 99,539 people live in the district, in which 12 different languages are spoken.
The total land area covers 7,970.3 square kilometers.

Link
Alotau District (official website)

References

Districts of Papua New Guinea
Milne Bay Province